James or Jim McDermott may refer to:

 James T. McDermott (politician) (1872–1938), American politician
 James T. McDermott (judge) (1926–1992), American judge
 Jimmy McDermott (1932–2006), English professional footballer
 Jim McDermott (born 1936), American politician
 James McDermott (business executive), American businessman, former CEO and chairman of Keefe, Bruyette & Woods
 James McDermott, blackjack strategy pioneer
 Jim McDermott (basketball) (1910–2009), American basketball and baseball coach
 James McDermott (baseball) (1846–1882), American baseball player
 Jim McDermott (illustrator) (born 1960), New Hampshire-based artist